Short Creek is a stream in the U.S. state of Tennessee. It is a tributary to the Tennessee River.

Short Creek was so named on account of its relatively short length.

References

Rivers of Hardin County, Tennessee
Rivers of Wayne County, Tennessee
Rivers of Tennessee